Mangalya Pallakku (Mal:മംഗല്യ പല്ലക്ക്, English Translation: Wedding-Sedan) is a Malayalam language comedy film released in the year 1 January 1998 starring Sreenivasan, Jagadish and Kasthuri. The film was directed by Vinod Roshan on the story by himself. Sathyanath has written the dialogues for the film. M. G. Sreekumar has done partial discography for this film. Balabhaskar was the younget compsoer in Malayalam cinema at the time (aged 17).

Plot
Mukundan is looking for a bride. He meets Seethalakshmi and likes her. But he is threatened by Raghavan who wishes to marry Seethalakshmi. Despite this Mukundan and Seethalakshmi gets married.

Cast
Sreenivasan as Mukundan 
Jagadish as Govindankutty 
Kasthuri as Seethalakshmi 
Rajashree as Gayathri
Jagathy Sreekumar as Sankara Variyar 
Cochin Haneefa as Raghavan 
 Tony as Prem Mohan 
Kozhikode Narayanan Nair as Sukumaran Nair 
Salim Kumar as Phalgunan 
Kalabhavan Rahman as Panicker
Santhakumari as Seethalakshmi's Mother 
Biju Menon as Dinesh

References

1990s Malayalam-language films
Films scored by Balabhaskar